Dillingham Airfield  is a public and military use airport located two nautical miles (4 km) west of the central business district of Mokulēia, in Honolulu County on the North Shore of Oahu in the U.S. state of Hawaii. It is operated by the Hawaii Department of Transportation under a 25-year lease from the United States Army. The airport is primarily used for gliding and sky diving operations, and also houses Civil Air Patrol (CAP) glider aircraft. Military operations consist largely of night operations for night vision device training and orientation flights for the United States Air Force Auxiliary (CAP). This airport is included in the Federal Aviation Administration (FAA) National Plan of Integrated Airport Systems for 2017–2021, in which it is categorized as a basic general aviation facility.

History

A communications station called Camp Kawaihapai was established here in 1922 on  along the Oahu Railway and Land Company line.
In the 1920s and 1930s, the railroad transported mobile coast artillery to the site.
By 1941, the Army leased additional land and established Mokulēia Airstrip. Curtiss P-40 fighters were deployed at North Shore airstrips at Kahuku, Haleiwa  and Mokulēia when the attack on Pearl Harbor took place. Aircraft taking off from nearby Haleiwa destroyed several attacking aircraft.

By the end of World War II, Mokulēia Airfield could handle B-29 Superfortress bombers. In 1946, the Army acquired an additional .
In 1948, the airfield was inactivated and renamed Dillingham Air Force Base in memory of Captain Henry Gaylord Dillingham, a B-29 airman who was killed in action over Kawasaki, Japan on July 25, 1945. Captain Dillingham was the son of Walter F. Dillingham and grandson of Benjamin Dillingham who founded the railroad which evolved into Hawaiian Dredging Company and the Dillingham Corporation.

Nike missiles were installed in the 1950s, but were obsolete by 1970.

In 1962, the State of Hawaii leased Dillingham for general aviation use. In the 1970s the base was transferred from the Air Force back to the Army. The state signed new leases with the Army in 1974 and 1983. In the 1980s, hangars, a control tower, and a fire station were built.

Facilities and aircraft 
Dillingham Airfield covers an area of 134 acres (54 ha) at an elevation of 14.2 feet (4.3 m) above mean sea level. It has one runway designated 8/26 with an asphalt surface measuring 9,007 by 75 feet (2,745 x 23 m).

As a general aviation joint-use facility, the airfield has one runway, a UNICOM tower, powered aircraft and glider hangars, and a tie down area for recreation aircraft.  Jet-A and Avgas are available in a self-serve facility utilizing credit cards for payment.  There were plans to extend the taxiway to the end of the 26 runway, but funding was delayed.  Air traffic, unless approved prior by the US Army, is limited to daytime operations by general aviation and sport parachuting operations.

For the 12-month period ending June 30, 2015, the airport had 103 operators a day: 96% general aviation and 4% military. At that time there were 47 aircraft based at this airport: 24 single-engine, 20 glider, 1 helicopter, and 2 ultralight.

Authority

Dillingham Airfield is part of a centralized state structure governing all of the airports and seaports of Hawaii.  The official authority of Dillingham Airfield is the Governor of Hawaii. The governor appoints the Director of the Hawaii State Department of Transportation who has jurisdiction over the Hawaii Airports Administrator.

The Hawaii Airports Administrator oversees six governing bodies: Airports Operations Office, Airports Planning Office, Engineering Branch, Information Technology Office, Staff Services Office, Visitor Information Program Office. Collectively, the six bodies have authority over the four airport districts in Hawaii: Hawaii District, Kauai District, Maui District and the principal Oahu District. Dillingham Airfield is a subordinate of the Oahu District officials.

Filming location
The television series Lost filmed several scenes at Dillingham Airfield, due to its remote location close to the North Shore, where the series was primarily filmed.
The fuselage from the fictional Oceanic Airlines flight 815 is also stored at Dillingham, and was transported to the beach when needed for filming.

Accidents and incidents
 On June 21, 2019, a Beechcraft King Air operated by the Oahu Parachute Center crashed at Dillingham Airfield while taking off for a sunset skydiving flight, killing all 11 people on board.

See also

 Hawaii World War II Army Airfields

References

 
 Maurer, Maurer (1969), Combat Squadrons of the Air Force, World War II, Air Force Historical Studies Office, Maxwell AFB, Alabama.

External links
 Hawaii DOT page for Dillingham Airfield
 Topographic map from USGS The National Map
 

Airports in Hawaii
Airports established in 1941
Transportation in Honolulu County, Hawaii
Buildings and structures in Honolulu County, Hawaii
Airfields of the United States Army Air Forces in Hawaii
1941 establishments in Hawaii